Martin Macháček (born 1 May 1989) is a professional Czech football player who currently plays for FK Loko Vltavín, on loan from 1. FK Příbram. Martin has started to play as four years old child at club FC Křivsoudov. In his fifteen years he transferred into AC Sparta Praha (U15 – U19). He has also represented his country at youth level U21.
He combines sport career with study of sport psychology at Charles University in Prague. During the year 2014 he was gaining study experience at University of Jyväskylä in Finland (Erasmus program).

References

External links
 
 
 
 
 Thesis repository

1989 births
Living people
Czech footballers
Czech Republic under-21 international footballers
Czech First League players
FK Dukla Prague players
FC Silon Táborsko players
SK Kladno players
1. FK Příbram players
FC Sellier & Bellot Vlašim players
Association football defenders
Charles University alumni